Gabriel Pérez Ramallo (born 29 March 1995) is a Uruguayan footballer who plays as a midfielder.

Career
Pérez began his senior career with Montevideo Wanderers, making his debut for the club on 12 March 2017, coming on as an 81st-minute substitute for Adrián Colombino in a 2-1 defeat to El Tanque Sisley. In August 2019, he was loaned out to then-Uruguayan Segunda División club Central Español. He would make five appearances during his five-month loan spell, and was released by Montevideo Wanderers prior to the 2020 season.

Career statistics

Club

References

External links
Profile at Copa Libertadores Website

1995 births
Living people
Montevideo Wanderers F.C. players
Central Español players
Uruguayan Primera División players
Uruguayan Segunda División players
Uruguayan footballers
Association football midfielders